Anthony Hamilton (12 July 1778 - 10 September 1851) was Archdeacon of Taunton from 5 December 1827 until his death.

Life
He was the younger son of Anthony Hamilton (Archdeacon of Colchester) and his wife Anne Terrick, daughter of Richard Terrick. His older brother was William Richard Hamilton.

Hamilton was educated at St John's College, Cambridge.

He married  Charity Graeme, third daughter of Sir Walter Farquhar, 1st Baronet, physician to the prince regent, and their eldest son was Walter Kerr Hamilton and their younger son was Edward William Terrick Hamilton.

Notes

1778 births
1851 deaths
19th-century English Anglican priests
Alumni of St John's College, Cambridge
Archdeacons of Taunton